Pelugo (Pilùch in local dialect) is a comune (municipality) in Trentino in the northern Italian region Trentino-Alto Adige/Südtirol, located about  west of Trento.

Pelugo borders the following municipalities: Spiazzo, Massimeno, Daone, Montagne, Villa Rendena and Vigo Rendena.

Demographic evolution

References

Cities and towns in Trentino-Alto Adige/Südtirol